Yemenis in the United Kingdom include citizens and non-citizen immigrants in the United Kingdom of Yemeni ancestry, as well as their descendants. Yemenis have been present in the UK since the 1860s, and are probably the longest-established Muslim group in the country, although currently much smaller than some other British Muslim groups.

Demographics
The 2001 UK Census recorded 12,508 Yemeni-born people in the UK. Recent estimates are of 70,000 to 80,000 people, including British-born people of Yemeni descent.

According to the 2011 UK Census, a total of 18,053 people born in Yemen were residing in the UK: 16,921 were recorded in England, 853 in Wales, 245 in Scotland  and 34 in Northern Ireland.
 

The National Association of British Arabs categorises Yemen-born immigrants as Arabs. Based on census data, it indicates that they are the seventh largest population of British Arabs by country of birth.

Communities

Yemenis are present across the entire UK. Cities with large and notable Yemeni populations are:
 BirminghamThe first immigrants arrived in the early 20th century, because they were offered work in the local metal-forming trades. However, as industry declined, unemployment rose in the city, and many Yemenis returned home. Despite this, Yemenis still have a strong presence in the city and have diversified by improving educational qualifications and setting up businesses. There are an estimated 10,000 Yemenis in Birmingham, about 1% of the city's population.
 CardiffYemeni seamen (Lascars) first arrived in the UK during the 19th century, with many settling in Cardiff among other areas to work in the docks and associated industries or on the railway. In the 1920s, an estimated 1,500 Yemenis lived in the city, making up half of its ethnic minority population. There are no reliable estimates of the present Yemeni-origin population of Cardiff.
 HullKingston upon Hull is also another port which saw the city's ethnic makeup drastically change in the early 20th century, although not to such an extent as in South Shields, Liverpool and the South Wales coast.
 LiverpoolThe first Yemenis arrived in Liverpool in the early 1900s, seamen and their families.  The present Yemeni-origin population of Liverpool is not known, but an estimated 400 Yemeni-owned newsagents are in the city. The Liverpool Yemeni/Arabic Centre was established by locals in 1997.  Most Arabs in Liverpool are of Yemeni origin.
 LondonDespite being the largest city in the UK and the home of the country's Yemeni embassy, it is unknown how many Yemenis live in London. Its Yemeni community is not as notable as other British locations. Many Jews of Yemenite descent live in NW London and Stamford Hill.
 ManchesterMany Yemenis migrated to Manchester around the early 20th century, largely attracted to the city's growing industrial base. They are located across the whole city, but one of the most noted communities is Salford, where today at least 500 people are of Yemeni origin.
 MiddlesbroughMiddlesbrough is another industrial town that witnessed a significant number of Yemeni arrivals.  The present Yemeni population is not known, but it is considerably smaller than the Yemeni population of the mid 1900s. This is due to decreasing industry, with many Yemenis either returning to Yemen or migrating to the Arab states of the Persian Gulf or the United States.
 NewportThe Welsh port is home to a fairly large Yemeni community that consists of several generations.  Many Yemenis came to the city to seek a better life.
 SheffieldOne of the UK's largest Yemeni communities is located in Sheffield, one of the industrial cities that attracted immigrants to work in the many factories that were experiencing a stage of prosperity in the mid 1900s. Yemenis number between 3,500 and 9,000 in Sheffield.
 South ShieldsAlthough not the largest Yemeni community in the UK, South Shields is the most notable. A wave of Yemeni sailors came to the UK in the early 20th century, which makes it one of the newest communities. Despite this, the period between now and then has seen drastic change in the town.  Muhammad Ali visited the local Yemeni Mosque and School in 1977. Today an estimated 1,000 - 3,000 people of Yemeni origin reside in the city (around 2% of the local population). For more information see South Shields' Yemeni community.
 SwanseaSwansea is one of three Welsh, and seven British ports that saw a large number of Yemeni seamen arrive for work and better living prospects throughout the 20th century.

Notable British-Yemenis or Yemenis residing in UK 
 

Bader Ben Hirsi: playwright and director
Gamal Yafai: boxer
Jade Thirlwall: singer, member of Little Mix (of Yemeni and Egyptian heritage)
Kaid Mohamed: Welsh-Yemeni professional footballer. 
Naseem Hamed: boxer 
Norman Hassan: musician, member of UB40
Khalid Saeed Yafai: boxer
Sara Ishaq: Scottish-Yemeni filmmaker. Her short documentary “Karama Has No Walls” was nominated for an Academy Award (in 2014) and BAFTA New Talent (in 2013).
Galal Yafai: boxer

Associations

 Liverpool Arabic Centre
 Liverpool Arab Arts Festival (LAAF)
 Yemeni Community Association in Greater Manchester
 The Amanah Masjid (The Muath Trust),Birmingham
 Halesowen and Dudley Yemeni Community Association
 Yemeni Community Association in Sandwell 
 Yemeni Community Association, London 
 The Council for Arab-British Understanding(Caabu)

See also
 British Arabs
 Demographics of Yemen
 Yemeni community of South Shields

External links
The Yemeni Project
Yemeni Students in the UK
Yemeni Embassy in London
Yemenis in Sheffield
British-Yemeni Society
History of Yemenis in the UK
Yemenis in Liverpool
Yemenis in Newport
Boarding House, a 2009 short documentary film about the Yemeni community in South Shields, by David Campbell

References

Arabs in the United Kingdom
 
Muslim communities in Europe
United Kingdom